Mojtaba Shakeri is an Iranian conservative politician who currently serves as a member of the City Council of Tehran.

References

1959 births
Living people
Society of Devotees of the Islamic Revolution politicians
Mojahedin of the Islamic Revolution Organization politicians
Tehran Councillors 2013–2017
Blind politicians
Iranian politicians with disabilities
Iranian blind people
Islamic Revolutionary Guard Corps personnel of the Iran–Iraq War